Hairmyres railway station is a railway station in the Hairmyres area of East Kilbride, South Lanarkshire, Greater Glasgow, Scotland.

It is crossed mid-loop by the A726 Queensway overbridge. These were closed and lifted in the late 1960s. The Hairmyres Hospital and Department for International Development's office are located nearby.

Up until the mid-1990s the area around the station was semi rural, but several new housing schemes have been built up in the area over the last decade or so giving far increased patronage to the station.

Facilities 
The station is open 24 hours a day (although trains only run through it for around 18 hours a day). The station is unstaffed, but there is a ticket machine in the station's heated and seated modern waiting shelter. There are 86 parking spaces and 4 cycle lockers also available. The station is served by a small newsagents.

Services 
The first train going to Glasgow Central is at 06:21 on weekdays, with the last train from East Kilbride to Glasgow at 23:59. Going from Glasgow to East Kilbride, the first and last trains are at 06:41 and 00:47 respectively.

Future 
Work is expected to begin in 2024.

References

External links
 Video footage of Hairmyres railway station.

Railway stations in South Lanarkshire
SPT railway stations
Railway stations served by ScotRail
Buildings and structures in East Kilbride
Former Caledonian Railway stations
Railway stations in Great Britain opened in 1868
1868 establishments in Scotland